Shannie Sloan Barnett (February 8, 1919 – July 2, 1991) was an American professional basketball player. He played for the Toledo Jim White Chevrolets in the National Basketball League during the 1942–43 season and averaged 3.5 points per game.

References

1919 births
1991 deaths
American men's basketball players
Basketball players from Arkansas
Centers (basketball)
Forwards (basketball)
Sportspeople from Pine Bluff, Arkansas
Toledo Jim White Chevrolets players